The Girl from Corfu (translit. Protevousianikes peripeteies) is a 1956 Greek comedy film directed by Yannis Petropoulakis. It was entered into the 7th Berlin International Film Festival.

Cast
 Rena Vlahopoulou - Rinoula
 Stephanos Stratigos - Angelos
 Stavros Iatridis
 Annie Ball - Marietta
 Popi Alva - Georgia
 Nikos Rizos - Thodoris
 Koulis Stoligas - Georges
 Vasilis Andreopoulos - Johnny
 Periklis Christoforidis - police captain

References

External links

1956 films
1950s Greek-language films
1956 comedy films
Films shot in Corfu
Films set in Greece
Greek comedy films